The second Wike Executive Council is the current Executive Council of Rivers State led by Ezenwo Nyesom Wike of the People's Democratic Party. It began to take shape following the House approval of Emmanuel C. Aguma as the Attorney General and Commissioner of Justice of the Rivers State government. It replaces the First Wike Executive Council which was dissolved on 24 June 2017. Among the commissioner-designees as of 8 August 2017 are seven former commissioners who served in the preceding Executive Council.

On 20 September, Governor Ezenwo Nyesom Wike assigned portfolios to 19 commissioners, with Emmanuel Okah as his Commissioner of Information and Communications. Former Secretary of the Rivers State People's Democratic Party Walter Ibibia was moved to the Ministry of Transport. Roseline Konya retained her previous position as Commissioner of Environment. Fred Kpakol, Boma Iyaye, Tonye Briggs-Oniyide, Damiete H. Miller and Ukel Oyaghiri were all returned to their past ministries.

Executive Council
The second Executive Council is currently composed of the following members:

References

Governorship of Ezenwo Nyesom Wike
2010s establishments in Rivers State
2017 politics in Rivers State
Cabinets established in 2017